Drummer Township is one of twelve townships in Ford County, Illinois, USA.  As of the 2010 census, its population was 4,023 and it contained 1,829 housing units.

History
The township was formed from a portion of Dix Township (originally named Drummer Grove Township) on March 1, 1869. Drummer Township is named after a hunting dog called Drummer, who died while chasing a deer and was buried in what became known as Drummer Grove.

Geography

Cities, towns, villages
 Gibson City

Extinct towns
 Derby
 Garber
 Harpster
 Proctor

Cemeteries
The township contains Drummer Township Cemetery.

Major highways
  Illinois Route 9
  Illinois Route 47
  Illinois Route 54

Airports and landing strips
 Gibson Community Hospital Heliport
 Wright Airport

Demographics

School districts
 Gibson City-Melvin-Sibley Community Unit School District 5

Political districts
 Illinois' 15th congressional district
 State House District 105
 State Senate District 53

References
 
 United States Census Bureau 2007 TIGER/Line Shapefiles
 United States National Atlas

External links
 City-Data.com
 Illinois State Archives

Townships in Ford County, Illinois
Townships in Illinois